"Charro" is a song first recorded by Elvis Presley as part of the soundtrack for his 1969 motion picture Charro!, a western directed by Charles Marquis Warren. It was its title song and the only song featured in the film, as it was Presley's first film where he didn't sing.

Writing and recording 
The song was written by Billy Strange and Mac Davis specially for the movie Charro!.

The recordings took place at the Samuel Goldwyn Studio in Hollywood in October–November 1968. Presley probably overdubbed his vocals on October 15. Takes 5 and 9 were spliced together to form the vocal master.

Release 
The song was first released on a single (in March 1969) with "Memories", a song from Elvis' 1968 NBC TV comeback special, on the opposite side. "Charro!" didn't chart on the Billboard Hot 100, while "Memories" charted, peaking at number 35.

"Charro"'s first LP release was on the album Almost in Love in late 1970.

On December 1, 1970, the single was re-released as part of RCA Victor's Gold Standard Series (together with 9 other Presley's singles).

Musical style and lyrics 
It is a western-style song.

Track listing 
7" single RCA 47-9731 (March 1969)
 "Memories"
 "Charro"

References

External links 
 Elvis Presley – Charro / Memories at Discogs

1969 songs
1969 singles
Elvis Presley songs
RCA Records singles

Songs written by Billy Strange
Songs written by Mac Davis
Songs written for films